Irving Feldman (born September 22, 1928) is an American poet and professor of English.

Academic career
Born and raised in Coney Island, Brooklyn, New York, Feldman worked as a merchant seaman, farm hand, and factory worker through his university education. After an undergraduate education at the City College of New York (B.A., 1950), Feldman completed his Master of Arts degree at Columbia University in 1953. His first academic appointments were at the University of Puerto Rico and the University of Lyon in France. Returning to the continental United States in 1958, he taught at Kenyon College until 1964, when he was appointed professor of English at the University at Buffalo, The State University of New York, where he was eventually appointed Distinguished Professor of English; he retired from teaching in 2004.

Published works
 Works and Days (1961), Little, Brown Book Group.
 The Pripet Marshes (1965), Viking.
 Magic Papers and Other Poems (1970), Harper & Row. 
 Lost Originals (1972) Holf, Rinehart and Winston. 
 Leaping Clear and Other Poems (1976), Viking.
 New and Selected Poems (1979), Viking. 
 Teach Me, Dear Sister (1983), Penguin Books. 
 All of Us Here and Other Poems (1986), Penguin Books.
 The Life and Letters (1994), University of Chicago Press. 
 Beautiful False Things: Poems (2000), Grove Press. 
 Collected Poems, 1954-2004 (2004), Shocken. 
 Usable Truths: Aphorisms & Observations (2019), Waywiser Press.

Awards and honors
Irving Feldman has received a number of accolades for his poetry which include the Guggenheim Fellowship, the National Institute of Arts & Letters award, the Academy of American Poets Fellowship, Ingram Merrill Foundation Fellowship, and the National Endowment for the Arts grant. In 1992 he was awarded a MacArthur Fellowship.

He received the 1962 National Jewish Book Award in the English Poetry category for Works and Days and Other Poems.

References

1928 births
Writers from Brooklyn
City College of New York alumni
Columbia University alumni
American male poets
Kenyon College faculty
Living people
American academics of English literature
MacArthur Fellows
American male non-fiction writers
People from Coney Island
American expatriates in France